Hidden Away is a 2014 Spanish romantic drama film written and directed by Mikel Rueda. Filmed in neighbourhoods throughout Bilbao, Rueda's goal was to create a scene that could be from any neighbourhood in any city. Rueda dedicated the project to Álex Angulo, a Basque actor who died in a car crash in July 2014. Themes that are present throughout the film are adolescent first love, sociocultural dilemmas, racism and deportation, and connecting emotionally through some of these barriers.

Summary
The film follows Rafa and Ibrahim, two teenage boys that befriend each other. Ibrahim is a Moroccan immigrant who does not want to return home. Lost and desperate in the streets of Bilbao, he meets Rafa. Rafa is a typical Spanish middle-class boy that is having problems with his friends and pressures around his sexuality. Once they meet each other, they become inseparable. Rueda captures their friendship as they navigate through Ibra's deportation, racism and their sexual identities.

Cast
 Germán Alcarazu as Rafa
 Adil Koukouh as Ibra
 Joseba Ugalde as Guille
 Moussa Echarif as Youssef
 Ana Wagener as Alicia
 Álex Angulo as Jose

Conversation
Rueda wanted to center the idea of adolescence and homosexuality in the discussion around Hidden Away. In his own words, he felt that most areas of society feel uncomfortable talking about the sexuality of teenagers. One of interesting aspects of his casting is that he did not want to limit the actors to identifying as gay themselves. His logic behind this process was that by limiting who could audition, the turnout would be lower and he might not find the actors that he was looking for. The result were two actors who were not gay—-or at least Rueda is unaware of their sexuality. While the process was difficult for both actors, they found that their innocence and transition with discomfort was not that far from what someone who is in the closet at their age would have to confront. Additionally, Adil had a serious connection with Ibra's character as a Moroccan immigrant who had personally experienced racism himself. Despite critics who noted the lack of sexual activity between the two actors, Rueda maintains that the sexual nature of their relationship was not the purpose of the film, but rather the moments before sex and the feelings that one cannot control emotionally.

Rueda found that the relationship between Moroccan adolescence and queer adolescence had parallel realities that he attempted to explore in the creation of this film. He felt that the way that Spain treats both demographics pushed them to live a escondidas or "hidden away". Rueda contents that Spain lives in a bubble where anyone who challenges that normativity threatens to pop that bubble, and this creates fear in the normative community. Therefore, some people must live hidden away within, or outside that bubble.

Awards
Although Hidden Away did not win any awards, it was nominated four times. It was also presented at the first LGTBI Life Festival at La Institución Ferial Alicantina (IFA).

 2nd Feroz Awards: Best Poster (Priscila Clementti).
 : Nuremberg International Human Rights Film Award (Mikel Rueda).
 Queer Lisboa: Best Feature Film (Mikel Rueda)
 24th Actors and Actresses Union Awards: Film: Performance in a Minor Role, Female (Ana Wagener)

References

External links
  
 

2014 LGBT-related films
2014 multilingual films
2014 romantic drama films
2010s Arabic-language films
2010s coming-of-age drama films
2010s buddy drama films
2010s Spanish-language films
2010s teen drama films
2010s teen romance films
Coming-of-age romance films
Films shot in Bilbao
Gay-related films
LGBT-related buddy drama films
LGBT-related coming-of-age films
LGBT-related romantic drama films
Spanish coming-of-age drama films
Spanish LGBT-related films
Spanish multilingual films
Spanish romantic drama films
Spanish teen drama films
Teen LGBT-related films